The Talmadge River is a  river in southern St. Louis County, Minnesota. It flows through Lakewood Township into Lake Superior, just north of the city of Duluth.

Talmadge River is named after Josiah Talmadge, a pioneer who settled near the river in 1856.

See also
List of rivers of Minnesota

References

External links
Minnesota Watersheds
USGS Hydrologic Unit Map - State of Minnesota (1974)

Rivers of Minnesota
Tributaries of Lake Superior
Rivers of St. Louis County, Minnesota